Kiel is an electoral constituency (German: Wahlkreis) represented in the Bundestag. It elects one member via first-past-the-post voting. Under the current constituency numbering system, it is designated as constituency 5. It is located in central Schleswig-Holstein, comprising the city of Kiel.

Kiel was created for the inaugural 1949 federal election. Since 2017, it has been represented by Mathias Stein of the Social Democratic Party (SPD).

Geography
Kiel is located in central Schleswig-Holstein. As of the 2021 federal election, it comprises the entirety of the urban district of Kiel, as well as the municipalities of Altenholz and Kronshagen from the Rendsburg-Eckernförde district.

History
Kiel was created in 1949. Until 1972, it was constituency 6 in the numbering system. In the 1949 and 1953 elections, it covered the entirety of the city of Kiel with the exception of voting districts 23 and 26–42. In the 1957 and 1961 elections, it did not contain the city districts of Wik and Ravensberg, which were part of the Rendsburg constituency. From 1965 to 1972, it did not include the city districts of Friedrichsort, Holtenau, Pries and Schilksee, which were part of the Schleswig - Eckernförde constituency.

From 1976 to 2002, Kiel was coterminous with the city of Kiel. For the 2002 election, the municipalities of Altenholz and Kronshagen were transferred from the Rendsburg-Eckernförde constituency to Kiel.

Members
The constituency has been held by the Social Democratic Party (SPD) during all but three Bundestag terms since 1949; it has returned a representative from the SPD in every federal election since 1961. Its first representative was Walter Brookmann of the Christian Democratic Union (CDU) from 1949–57, followed by Hans-Carl Rüdel, also from the CDU. It was won by the SPD in 1961, and represented by Fritz Baade for a single term. He was succeeded by Hans Müthling, who served until 1972. Between then and 1998, it was represented by Norbert Gansel. Gansel left the Bundestag to become mayor of Kiel, and Hans-Peter Bartels was elected as representative in the 1998 federal election, and served until 2017, when he was succeeded by Mathias Stein.

Election results

2021 election

2017 election

2013 election

2009 election

References

Federal electoral districts in Schleswig-Holstein
1949 establishments in West Germany
Constituencies established in 1949